Nine Media News and Current Affairs (formerly Solar News and Current Affairs Solar News and 9News and Current Affairs/9News) is the news and public affairs production arm and sole division of the media conglomerate Nine Media Corporation leasing the airtime of Radio Philippines Network. The division is in charge of production of local news and content of CNN Philippines. 9News ceased identifying themselves explicitly under such brand when the channel was launched on March 16, 2015.

Background
After Solar Entertainment Corporation acquired 34 percent of Radio Philippines Network from the Philippine government as part of RPN/IBC privatization in 2011, Solar TV ventured into the news at the end of 2011. On July 16, 2012, Solar News launched its first local newscasts including Solar Network News, Solar Newsday, Solar Daybreak and Solar Nightly News.

In November 2013, San Miguel Corporation President and COO Ramon S. Ang acquired a majority stake in Solar Television Network  as well as its stake on RPN, The Tiengs were the majority stockholders then of STVNI. Meanwhile, on August 20, 2014, Solar Entertainment Corporation chief Wilson Tieng announced that he ceded his entire share on Solar TV Network, Inc., including its 34% majority share on RPN, to the now-late Antonio Cabangon-Chua (b.  - d. ), owner of business newspaper BusinessMirror and Aliw Broadcasting Corporation. The Tiengs were losing money after they invested in RPN and the group focused on the cable channels of the Solar Entertainment Corporation To reflect the change of ownership, and upon announcement of the rebranding of Solar News Channel into 9TV by August 23, Solar News will also rebrand into 9News, retaining its news and current affairs programming as 9TV expands its weekend programming.

9News underwent major overhaul as parent Nine Media Corporation signed a 5-year brand licensing agreement (later extended until the end of 2024) with Turner Broadcasting System/Warner Bros. Discovery to share resources with CNN to integrate the latter's content and 9News's reporting as CNN Philippines that launched on March 16, 2015. 9News ceased identifying themselves explicitly under that name with the reformat.

Programs

News
CNN Philippines News Night
CNN Philippines Newsroom
CNN Philippines Newsroom Ngayon
CNN Philippines Newsroom Weekend
CNN Philippines New Day
CNN Philippines Updates
CNN Philippines Balitaan
CNN Philippines Sports Desk
CNN Philippines Sports Desk Weekend
CNN Philippines Business Roundup
CNN Philippines Busina Balita
News.PH
The Final Word

Current affairs
Leading Women (produced by Go Motion Productions)
Medtalk Health Talk
Politics as Usual
Profiles
Story of the Filipino
The Source

Public service
CNN Philippines Traffic Center

See also
Radio Philippines Network
Nine Media Corporation
Solar Entertainment Corporation (former division)
Solar News Channel
9TV
CNN Philippines
Talk TV

References

External links

Solar Entertainment Official Website
 

 
Solar Entertainment Corporation
Solar News and Current Affairs
Philippine television news shows